This Is Hampton Hawes (subtitled Vol. 2, The Trio) is an album by pianist Hampton Hawes recorded at sessions in 1955 and 1956 and released on the Contemporary label.

Reception

The Allmusic review states "this Hampton Hawes date would certainly make good company for any other top jazz piano trio records in your collection".

Track listing
 "You and the Night and the Music" (Arthur Schwartz, Howard Dietz) - 3:45
 "Stella by Starlight" (Victor Young, Ned Washington) - 4:52
 "Blues for Jacque" (Hampton Hawes) - 4:34
 "Yesterdays" (Jerome Kern, Otto Harbach) - 4:53
 "Steeplechase" (Charlie Parker) - 2:51
 "'Round About Midnight" (Thelonious Monk) - 5:21
 "Just Squeeze Me" (Duke Ellington) - 6:31
 "Autumn in New York" (Vernon Duke) - 5:19
 "Section Blues" (Red Mitchell, Chuck Thompson) - 4:12
Recorded at Los Angeles Police Academy in Chavez Ravine on June 28, 1955 (track 7) and at Contemporary's Studio in Los Angeles, California on December 3, 1955 (tracks 2, 4, 5, 8 & 9) and January 25, 1956 (tracks 1, 3 & 6)

Personnel
Hampton Hawes - piano
Red Mitchell - bass 
Chuck Thompson - drums

References

Contemporary Records albums
Hampton Hawes albums
1956 albums